Scott Spurling (born 6 June 1993 in Hendon, England) is an English former professional rugby union player. He played at hooker for Saracens and attended Haberdashers' Aske's Boys' School in Elstree, Hertfordshire as well as attending Harrow School for sixth form.
Junior Commonwealth Games gold medalist 2011. Junior World Cup U20 Winner 2013.

References

External links
Premiership Rugby Profile
European Professional Club Rugby Profile
Saracens Profile

1993 births
Living people
English rugby union players
Rugby union players from Hendon
Saracens F.C. players
Rugby union hookers